Gorenji Potok is a small settlement in the Municipality of Kostel in southern Slovenia. The area is part of the traditional region of Lower Carniola and is now included in the Southeast Slovenia Statistical Region.

A prehistoric Iron Age site has been discovered on Jastrnik Hill south of the settlement.

References

External links
Gorenji Potok on Geopedia

Populated places in the Municipality of Kostel